The Tumblebug Complex Fire burned  of Willamette National Forest land in Lane County, Oregon, United States, from September 12, 2009 to October 2009.

Growth and containment
Firefighters had difficulty fighting them due to the remote location and the rugged terrain, such as basalt cliffs. The fires primarily burned trees ranging from 10 to 45 years old.

By September 16, the fires had combined into three fires that were about  each in size. At that time, there were already 255 firefighters working to control the fires and the Willamette National Forest was forced to close several United States Forest Service roads.

Nearly 600 firefighters were working to contain the fire by September 21, as the air became drier. Two days later, on September 23, the Lane Regional Air Protection Agency rated the air quality in the "unhealthy" category for Eugene, and reported that the air quality was better in Oakridge. NASA satellite images showed that the smoke was being blown into British Columbia.

The wind blew the smoke to the north, and created a hazy sky in Bend.

The 1,275 firefighters then working to put out the fire had it 12 percent contained, but predicted that it would continue burning until mid-October. Two firefighters were injured as well.

While wetter and cooler weather was forecasted, the fire continued to expand.

References

External links

Slideshow of photos of the fire from The Register-Guard
Videos related to the fire from Google Videos

2009 in Oregon
2009 wildfires in the United States
Wildfires in Oregon
Willamette National Forest